Marek Andrezj Szmid (born 2 March 1982) is an English retired professional footballer who played as a midfielder.

Early life
Szmid was born in Nuneaton, Warwickshire.

Club career

Manchester United
Szmid signed for Manchester United as a youth trainee in July 1998. He made his first appearance for United in the friendly against the San Diego Nomads in August. He scored his first goal for the club in the FA Premier Academy League under-17 match against Derby County on 12 September. United won the game 4−0. On 5 December, Szmid made his first appearance for the reserves; he replaced Lee Roche in the friendly against a Major League Soccer under-21 side. He featured in the NIVEA Junior Football Tournament in April 1999 and played against the likes of Bayern Munich and VfB Stuttgart as United were runners-up. In July, he played in every game as United participated in the Milk Cup in Northern Ireland. They lost 2−1 to Crewe Alexandra in the final.

Szmid played in the Jersey Tournament in August 1999; he took part in the win versus Rangers and the defeat against Benfica. On 21 September, he signed his first professional contract with United. He played in the 2−1 defeat against Nottingham Forest in the FA Youth Cup third round at Gigg Lane. Szmid made 20 appearances as United finished third in Group B before falling to West Ham United in FA Premier Academy League under-19 playoffs. Post season he was part of the squad that took part in the International Youth Tournament hosted by Real Sociedad. He started all three group games against Sevilla, Osasuna, and Real Sociedad, but United failed to qualify for the final.

In August 2000, Szmid played in the Bayern Munich Centenary Youth Tournament; he featured in four games and scored in the 2−2 draw with IFK Göteborg. He scored for the reserves in the friendly against Bristol City in September. The game, a testimonial for City's Buster Footman, finished 4−0 at Ashton Gate. He featured throughout United's run to the Manchester Senior Cup final but was an unused substitute in the final defeat to Manchester City at Old Trafford in May 2001. He was released by United on 30 June. Szmid spent just over three years at United but failed to make a senior appearance.

Southend United
Szmid signed for Third Division club Southend United in November 2001. His first involvement with the first team was as an unused substitute in the defeat at Shrewsbury Town on 24 November. On 23 February 2002, he made his debut when he replaced Brian Barry-Murphy in the 80th minute of the 5−1 defeat against Hartlepool United. Szmid was involved in several other matchday squads before the end of the season, but he only made one more appearance for United when he started the defeat against Leyton Orient in March. This was his final appearance for Southend and he left the club in the summer.

Later career
Szmid later played non-league football with Sutton Coldfield Town and Marine.
In the same season he moved to play for Nuneaton Griff. In 2004, he played for Nuneaton Borough. The next season saw him playing for Vauxhall Motors. That season saw him suffering a bad injury which caused him to retire from playing football. After retiring, he attended Liverpool John Moores University where he graduated with a B.A. in Sports Development in 2007. Whilst studying he suffered a severe injury which caused his playing career to stop. The following year he attended the University of Chester where he took part in the GTP (Graduate Teacher Programme). He started teaching Physical Education at Ashton-on-Mersey School in Trafford in 2008. In September 2010 he started work as the Assistant Head of Education and Welfare at Manchester United F.C.

International career

ESFA U15
Szmid represented English Schools' Football Association (ESFA) under-15s and the team reached 3rd place of the mini World Cup at the Montaigu Tournament in France. He was in the last ESFA under-15 team when they beat Germany 1–0 at the Olympic Stadium in Berlin, before The Football Association took over the running of Schools' Football.

England U16
Szmid represented England at 1999 UEFA European Under-16 Championship in the Czech Republic. He featured in the quarter final defeat against the Czech Republic on 2 May 1999; he played 61 minutes before being replaced by Jay Bothroyd as England lost 1−0 after extra time.

England futsal
Szmid was called up to the England national futsal team for the Four Nations tournament in March 2005. On 9 March, he made his debut against France and scored a penalty in the 5−2 defeat in Villeneuve-d'Ascq, France. Two days later, he played in the loss against Finland as England finished last place in the tournament.

Career statistics

References

External links

Marek Szmid at SouthendUnited.co.uk

1982 births
Living people
English footballers
Manchester United F.C. players
Southend United F.C. players
Sutton Coldfield Town F.C. players
Marine F.C. players
Nuneaton Griff F.C. players
Nuneaton Borough F.C. players
Alumni of Liverpool John Moores University
Alumni of the University of Chester
Vauxhall Motors F.C. players
English Football League players
Association football midfielders
English people of Polish descent
Sportspeople from Nuneaton
English men's futsal players